Serine/threonine-protein phosphatase 2A 65 kDa regulatory subunit A alpha isoform is an enzyme that in humans is encoded by the PPP2R1A gene. In the plant Arabidopsis thaliana a similar enzyme is encoded by the RCN1 gene (At1g25490).

Function 
This gene encodes a constant regulatory subunit of protein phosphatase 2. Protein phosphatase 2 is one of the four major Ser/Thr phosphatases, and it is implicated in the negative control of cell growth and division. It consists of a common heteromeric core enzyme, which is composed of a catalytic subunit and a constant regulatory subunit, that associates with a variety of regulatory subunits. The constant regulatory subunit A serves as a scaffolding molecule to coordinate the assembly of the catalytic subunit and a variable regulatory B subunit. This gene encodes an alpha isoform of the constant regulatory subunit A.

Interactions 
PPP2R1A has been shown to interact with:

 CTTNBP2NL,
 FAM40A,
 PPP2CB, PPP2CA, PPP4C,
 PPP2R2A,
 PPP2R3B,
 PPP2R5A.
 STK24,
 STRN, and
 STRN3.

Arabidopsis RCN1
RCN1 At1g25490 is one of three genes in Arabidopsis encoding Phosphoprotein Phosphatase 2A Regulatory Subunit A (PP2Aa). The association of different b subunits with a PP2Aa-PP2ac dimer is believed to determine substrate specificity.

References

Further reading